The women's heptathlon event at the 2006 African Championships in Athletics was held at the Stade Germain Comarmond on August 11–12.

Medalists

Results

100 metres hurdles
Wind: -3.3 m/s

High jump

Shot put

200 metres
Wind: -3.9 m/s

Long jump

Javelin throw

800 metres

Final standings

References
Results 
Results

2006 African Championships in Athletics
Combined events at the African Championships in Athletics
2006 in women's athletics